Barama Assembly constituency is one of the 126 assembly constituencies of Assam Legislative Assembly in Baksa District of lower Assam. Barama forms part of the Kokrajhar Lok Sabha constituency.

Members of Legislative Assembly 
1951: Part of 46 no. Patacharkuchi Barama Constituency (1) Homeswar Deb Choudhury Winner 1 Socialist Party, (2) Baikunthanath Das Winner 2 Indian National Congress. Voting took place in early 1952. 
1957: Part of 45 no. Patacharkuchi Constituency (1) Birendra Kumar Das Winner 1 Praja Socialist Party, (2) Surendra Nath Das, Winner 2 Indian National Congress.
1962: Surendra Nath Das, Indian National Congress.
1967: Surendra Nath Das, Indian National Congress.
1972: Surendra Nath Das, Indian National Congress.
1978: Baikuntha Nath Das, Indian National Congress.
1978: Alit Chandra Boro, PTC.
1985: Rekha Rani Das Boro, Independent.
1991: Pani Ram Rabha, NAGP.
1996: Rekha Rani Das Boro, AGP.
2001: Paniram Rabha, Indian National Congress.
2006: Maneswar Brahma, Independent.
2011: Maneswar Brahma, BOPF.
2016: Maneswar Brahma, BOPF.
2021: Bhupen Baro, UPPL.

Election results

2016 result

References

External links 
 

Assembly constituencies of Assam